Jonas Olsson is a Finnish music producer, audio engineer and songwriter.
He has worked and collaborated with many international acts, producers, and songwriters 
such as Andreas Carlsson (SWE), Kristinia DeBarge (US), Radical Something (US), Rasmus Thude (DK), and The Ocean (GER).
He has also worked on many Finnish acts, including Robin, Jannika B, Poisonblack, Sami Saari, Absoluuttinen Nollapiste, Superscar, Annika Eklund, Deep Insight, Blind Channel and  Callisto.
Olsson is currently managed by Los Angeles-based management Perfection Shows and 
collaborates frequently with the production team Goodwill & MGI.

Albums produced 

Noir by Callisto (2006)
Precambrian by The Ocean (2007)
Lyijy by Poisonblack (2013)
Boom Kah by Robin (2013)Minä ja Hehkumo by Pauli Hanhiniemi (2014)Revolutions by Blind Channel (2016)Blood Brothers by Blind Channel (2018)Violent Pop'' by Blind Channel (2020)

References

External links 

 
 Jonas Olsson / Big Disc Productions on Facebook
 Jonas Olsson on Discogs
 Jonas Olsson on Meteli.net

Finnish record producers
Living people
Finnish songwriters
1981 births